Nanovirus is a genus of viruses, in the family Nanoviridae. Legume plants serve as natural hosts. There are 11 species in this genus. Diseases associated with this genus include: stunting, severe necrosis and early plant death.

Taxonomy
The following 11 species are assigned to the genus:

Black medic leaf roll virus
Cow vetch latent virus
Faba bean necrotic stunt virus
Faba bean necrotic yellows virus
Faba bean yellow leaf virus
Milk vetch dwarf virus
Parsley severe stunt associated virus
Pea necrotic yellow dwarf virus
Pea yellow stunt virus
Sophora yellow stunt virus
Subterranean clover stunt virus

Structure and genome

Virions in the genus Nanovirus are non-enveloped, with icosahedral and round geometries, and T=1 symmetry. The diameter is around 18-19 nm. 

The genome is multipartite, and the genome components (6 or 8, depending on the genus) are circular, around 1kb in length, essentially carry only one gene, and are individually encapsidated forming small icosahedral virions (18–20 nm).

Life cycle
Viral replication is nuclear. Entry into the host cell is achieved by penetration into the host cell. Replication follows the ssDNA rolling circle model. DNA-templated transcription is the method of transcription. The virus exits the host cell by nuclear pore export, and tubule-guided viral movement.
Legume plants serve as the natural host. The virus is transmitted via a vector (the virus does not replicate in this). Transmission routes are vector.

References

External links
 ICTV Report: Nanoviridae
 Viralzone: Nanovirus

Nanoviridae
Virus genera